Colombo Lighthouse is a Lighthouse in Colombo in Sri Lanka and it is operated and maintained by the Sri Lanka Ports Authority. It is located at Galbokka Point south of the Port of Colombo on the waterfront along the marine drive, in Colombo fort.

History

The current  lighthouse was built in 1952 after the Old Colombo Lighthouse was deactivated when its light became obscured by nearby buildings as part of the Colombo Harbor Expansion project. It was opened by Rt Hon D. S. Senanayake, the first prime minister of Ceylon.

Due to the panoramic view of the Indian Ocean it offered, it became a city landmark. With the escalation of the Sri Lankan Civil War, public access to the site was restricted. This was due to its placement in a high-security zone as it is across the street from the Naval Headquarters and close proximity of the Port of Colombo.

Saluting battery
Located at its base is a naval gun battery that is used by the Sri Lanka Navy for its traditional gun salutes. By tradition the Navy accords a 25-gun salute to the nation on the National day, which is 4 February each year. The tradition originated when the sailors of the Ceylon Royal Naval Volunteer Reserve fired a 15- Gun Salute at the Galle Face Green on the first Independence Day on 4 February 1948. With the formation of the Royal Ceylon Navy, HMCyS Vijaya, the first warship of the navy according a 25-gun salute on 4 February 1951 with its single QF 4-inch naval gun. In 1952 two additional QF 4-inch naval guns were brought from the United Kingdom and mounted at Galle Buck Bay in the Colombo harbour in preparation of the Royal visit of Princess Elizabeth, which did not occur as she returned halfway due to the death of her father the King. Royal Ceylon Navy awarded a 56 gun salute on the day of the King's funeral. After HMCyS Vijaya was decommissioned its QF 4-inch naval gun was added to the battery. The guns were moved to the lighthouse and fired the gun salute since 2000. In 2000, three 52 mm guns were installed, having been gifted from the Indian Navy which are used to fire the gun salutes till 2020. In 2021, the independence day gun salute was fired from SLNS Samudura and the tradition has been naval ships after the Colombo Lighthouse became landlocked aft the construction of the Colombo Port City.

See also

List of lighthouses in Sri Lanka

References

External links
 Sri Lanka Ports Authority 
 Lighthouses of Sri Lanka

Lighthouses completed in 1952
Lighthouses in Sri Lanka
Buildings and structures in Colombo
Sri Lanka Navy
Government buildings in Colombo